Beta-decay stable isobars are the set of nuclides which cannot undergo beta decay, that is, the transformation of a neutron to a proton or a proton to a neutron within the nucleus.  A subset of these nuclides are also stable with regards to double beta decay or theoretically higher simultaneous beta decay, as they have the lowest energy of all nuclides with the same mass number.

This set of nuclides is also known as the line of beta stability, a term already in common use in 1965.  This line lies along the bottom of the nuclear valley of stability.

Introduction
The line of beta stability can be defined mathematically by finding the nuclide with the greatest binding energy for a given mass number, by a model such as the classical semi-empirical mass formula developed by C. F. Weizsäcker.  These nuclides are local maxima in terms of binding energy for a given mass number.

All odd mass numbers have only one beta decay stable nuclide.

Among even mass number, five (124, 130, 136, 150, 154) have three beta-stable nuclides.  None have more than three; all others have either one or two.

From 2 to 34, all have only one.
From 36 to 72, only eight (36, 40, 46, 50, 54, 58, 64, 70) have two, and the remaining 12 have one.
From 74 to 122, three (88, 90, 118) have one, and the remaining 23 have two.
From 124 to 154, only one (140) has one, six have three, and the remaining 10 have two.
From 156 to 262, only eighteen have one, and the remaining 36 have two, though there may also exist some undiscovered ones.

All primordial nuclides are beta decay stable, with the exception of 40K, 50V, 87Rb, 113Cd, 115In, 138La, 176Lu, and 187Re.  In addition, 123Te and 180mTa have not been observed to decay, but are believed to undergo beta decay with an extremely long half-life (over 1015 years). Non-primordial 247Cm should undergo beta decay to 247Bk, but has also never been observed to do so. Finally, 48Ca and 96Zr have not been observed to undergo beta decay (which is theoretically possible for both), but double beta decay is known for both. All elements up to and including nobelium, except technetium and promethium, are known to have at least one beta-stable isotope.

List of known beta-decay stable isobars

350 beta-decay stable nuclides are currently known. Theoretically predicted or experimentally observed double beta-decay is shown by arrows, i.e. arrows point towards the lightest-mass isobar. (This is sometimes dominated by alpha decay or spontaneous fission, especially for the heavy elements.)

No beta-decay stable nuclide has proton number 43 or 61 and no beta-decay stable nuclide has neutron number 19, 21, 35, 39, 45, 61, 71, 89, 115, 123, or 147.

All beta-decay stable nuclides with A ≥ 209 were observed to decay by alpha decay except some where spontaneous fission dominates. With the exception of 262No, no nuclides with A > 260 have been definitively identified as beta-stable. 260Fm and 262No are unconfirmed.

The general patterns of beta-stability are expected to continue into the region of superheavy elements, though the exact location of the center of the valley of stability is model dependent. It is widely believed that an island of stability exists along the beta stability line for isotopes of elements around copernicium that are stabilized by shell closures in the region; such isotopes would decay primarily through alpha decay or spontaneous fission. Beyond the island of stability, various models that correctly predict the known beta-stable isotopes predict anomalies in the beta-stability line that are unobserved in any known nuclides, such as the existence of two beta-stable nuclides with the same odd mass number. This is a consequence of the fact that a semi-empirical mass formula must consider shell correction and nuclear deformation, which become far more pronounced for heavy nuclides.

Beta decay toward minimum mass
Beta decay generally causes isotopes to decay toward the isobar with the lowest mass (which is often, but not always, the one with highest binding energy) with the same mass number, those not in italics in the table above.  Thus, those with lower atomic number and higher neutron number than the minimum-mass isobar undergo beta-minus decay, while those with higher atomic number and lower neutron number undergo beta-plus decay or electron capture.  However, there are four nuclides that are exceptions, in that the majority of their decays are in the opposite direction:

Notes

References

External links
 Decay-Chains https://www-nds.iaea.org/relnsd/NdsEnsdf/masschain.html
 (Russian) Beta-decay stable nuclides up to Z=118

Nuclear physics